Peter Vikström (born 4 January 1977 in Piteå) is a wheelchair tennis player. He won the Paralympic men's doubles competition at the 2012 Summer Paralympics with his partner Stefan Olsson. He started playing tennis when he was 21.

References

External links
 
 

1977 births
Living people
Swedish male tennis players
Swedish wheelchair tennis players
Paralympic wheelchair tennis players of Sweden
Paralympic gold medalists for Sweden
Paralympic silver medalists for Sweden
Paralympic medalists in wheelchair tennis
Medalists at the 2008 Summer Paralympics
Medalists at the 2012 Summer Paralympics
Wheelchair tennis players at the 2000 Summer Paralympics
Wheelchair tennis players at the 2004 Summer Paralympics
Wheelchair tennis players at the 2008 Summer Paralympics
Wheelchair tennis players at the 2012 Summer Paralympics
People from Piteå
Sportspeople from Norrbotten County
21st-century Swedish people